Atemoztli  is the sixteenth month of the Aztec calendar. It is also a festival  in the Aztec religion dedicated to Tlaloc and Tlaloque.

References

Aztec calendars
Aztec mythology and religion